Aniello Cutolo (born 19 May 1983) is a former Italian footballer, who played as a forward or attacking midfielder, currently executive for Arezzo.

External links

1983 births
Footballers from Naples
Living people
Italian footballers
Association football forwards
S.S.C. Napoli players
Benevento Calcio players
S.S.C. Giugliano players
Atletico Roma F.C. players
S.S. Arezzo players
Hellas Verona F.C. players
Taranto F.C. 1927 players
A.C. Perugia Calcio players
F.C. Crotone players
Calcio Padova players
Delfino Pescara 1936 players
U.S. Livorno 1915 players
Virtus Entella players
S.S. Juve Stabia players
Serie B players
Serie C players